Ectadium is a genus of flowering plants belonging to the family Apocynaceae.

Its native range is Namibia to South African Republic.

Species:

Ectadium rotundifolium 
Ectadium virgatum

References

Apocynaceae
Apocynaceae genera